Bakich is a surname. Notable people with the surname include:

Andrei Bakich (1878–1922), Russian army officer
Erik Bakich (born 1977), American college baseball coach and player
Huntley Bakich (born 1973), American football player

See also
131245 Bakich, an asteroid
Bakić (surname)